The 2019 FIA R-GT Cup is the fifth edition of the FIA rally cup for GT cars in Group R-GT. The cup is being contested over 8 tarmac rounds from the WRC, the ERC and the Rallye International du Valais.

Calendar 
The calendar for the 2019 season features eight tarmac rallies: three rounds from the WRC, one round from the ERC, one rally from the TER series and three European national rallies.

Entries

Results

Standings
Points are awarded to the top ten classified finishers.

Source:

FIA R-GT Cup for Drivers

FIA R-GT Cup for Manufacturers

References 

FIA R-GT Cup
R-GT Cup